This is a list of the 10 members of the European Parliament for Ireland appointed to the delegation from the Oireachtas following the 1973 general election. The second delegation served from March 1973 until the 1977 general election.

See also
Members of the European Parliament 1958–1979 – List by country

External links
ElectionsIreland.org – March 1973 Delegation
European Parliament office in Ireland – Irish MEPs: 1973–79

1973b
1973 in Ireland
List
Ireland